The  was a trade union centre in Japan. It was founded in December 1926, following the split in the Social Democratic Party as the leaders of the dissident Japan Labour-Farmer Party were expelled from the social-democratic Japan Federation of Labour (Sodomei) trade union centre. The Japan Labour Union League functioned as the trade union wing of the Japan Labour-Farmer Party, and had around 5,000-6,000 members.

References 

1926 establishments in Japan
National trade union centers of Japan
Trade unions established in 1926